Lewis Robert Wolberg (July 4, 1905 – February 3, 1988) was an American psychoanalyst. He advocated the use of hypnoanalysis in psychiatric treatment. He wrote or edited 20 books, and in 1945 founded the Postgraduate Center for Mental Health in New York City.

In 1927, Wolberg graduated from the University of Rochester and obtained his M.D. from Tufts University School of Medicine in 1930. From 1967 to 1986, he was professor of psychiatry at the New York University School of Medicine.

Wolberg was also interested in dieting and nutrition. He authored The Psychology of Eating in 1936. He was highly critical of fad diets. To treat obesity, he recommended a low-calorie diet.

Selected publications

The Psychology of Eating (1936)
Medical Hypnosis (two volumes, 1948)
The Technique of Psychotherapy (1954)
Hypnosis, is it for you? (1972)
Handbook of Short-Term Psychotherapy (1980)
The Practice of Psychotherapy: 506 Questions and Answers (1982)
"Hypnoanalysis"  1945, 2nd. edition 1964

References 

1905 births
1988 deaths
American psychiatrists
Diet food advocates
Emigrants from the Russian Empire to the United States
Tufts University School of Medicine alumni
University of Rochester alumni